Badger Pass may refer to:

Mountain passes
Badger Pass (Alberta) , a pass in Banff National Park, Alberta, Canada
Badger Pass (California) , a pass in Yosemite National Park, California, US
Badger Pass (Flathead Range) , a pass on the Continental Divide of the Americas in Bob Marshall Wilderness, Montana, US
Badger Pass (Pioneer Mountains) , a pass in the Pioneer Mountains, Montana, US

Winter sports area
Badger Pass Ski Area, a ski area near Badger Pass (California) in Yosemite National Park, California, US